Nedstrand is a former municipality in Rogaland county, Norway.  The  municipality was located along the Nedstrandfjorden, an inner branch off the main Boknafjorden.  The municipality encompassed the majority of the Nedstrand peninsula. Originally (from 1838 to 1868) it also included the Sjernarøyane islands and the western part of the island of Ombo in the fjord to the south.  The administrative centre of the municipality was the village of Nedstrand. Nedstrand Church is located in Hindaråvåg, a small village just west of Nedstrand village. Today, the area is part of the large municipality of Tysvær.

History
The parish of Nærstrand was established as a municipality on 1 January 1838 (see formannskapsdistrikt law).  Originally, it encompassed the two sokn (parishes) of Hinderaa and Sjærnerø, located on the northern (mainland) part of the municipality and the southern (islands) in the Nedstrandfjorden, respectively.  On 1 January 1868, the municipality was divided into two separate municipalities, named after the two sokn that made up Nærstrand: Hinderaa (population: 1,680) and Sjærnerø (population: 922). On 10 August 1881 the name of Hinderaa municipality was changed by royal resolution to Nerstrand.  Later, between 1910 and 1920 the spelling was changed slightly to Nedstrand to better match the local pronunciation.

During the 1960s, there were many municipal mergers across Norway due to the work of the Schei Committee. On 1 January 1965, the municipality of Nedstrand (population: 1,200) was merged with the neighboring municipality of Tysvær and parts of the municipalities of Avaldsnes, Skjold, Vats, and Vikedal to form the new municipality of Tysvær.

Government
All municipalities in Norway, including Nedstrand, are responsible for primary education (through 10th grade), outpatient health services, senior citizen services, unemployment and other social services, zoning, economic development, and municipal roads.  The municipality is governed by a municipal council of elected representatives, which in turn elects a mayor.

Municipal council
The municipal council  of Nedstrand was made up of 17 representatives that were elected to four year terms.  The party breakdown of the final municipal council was as follows:

See also
List of former municipalities of Norway

References

Tysvær
Former municipalities of Norway
1838 establishments in Norway
1964 disestablishments in Norway